Aldabrinus aldabrinus is a species of pseudoscorpion that is known from Aldabra in the Seychelles and from Mozambique. It is suspected to be widespread along the east African coast. It is found in dry open woodland or scrub.

References

Arthropods of Mozambique
Garypoidea
Garypinidae
Animals described in 1930
Arthropods of Seychelles